James Anderson (born 15 February 1974) is a retired English badminton player. He was part of the English national team that won the gold medal in the mixed team event, and a bronze medal in the men's doubles at the 2002 Commonwealth Games. Anderson competed in the national event for Essex team.

Achievements

Commonwealth Games 
Men's doubles

World Junior Championships 
The Bimantara World Junior Championships was an international invitation badminton tournament for junior players. It was held in Jakarta, Indonesia from 1987 to 1991.

Boys' doubles

European Junior Championships 
Boys' doubles

IBF World Grand Prix 
The World Badminton Grand Prix sanctioned by International Badminton Federation (IBF) since 1983.

Men's doubles

IBF International 
Men's doubles

Mixed doubles

References

External links 

1974 births
Living people
Sportspeople from Essex
English male badminton players
Badminton players at the 2002 Commonwealth Games
Commonwealth Games gold medallists for England
Commonwealth Games bronze medallists for England
Commonwealth Games medallists in badminton
Medallists at the 2002 Commonwealth Games